The Secret Life of the Waterboys 81–85 is an album of outtakes, live tracks, and demos, released by The Waterboys in 1994.

Track listing
Tracks written by Mike Scott, unless otherwise noted.
 "Medicine Bow"  (Scott, Anthony Thistlethwaite)  – 5:07  
 "That Was the River"  – 4:45  
 "A Pagan Place"  – 5:19  
 "Billy Sparks"  – 3:21  
 "Savage Earth Heart"  – 7:23  
 "Don't Bang the Drum"  (Scott, Karl Wallinger)   – 5:57  
 "The Ways of Men"  (Scott, Thistlewaite)   – 6:36  
 "Rags (Second Amendment)"  – 5:15  
 "The Earth Only Endures"  (Scott, Traditional)   – 5:04  
 "Somebody Might Wave Back"  – 2:03  
 "Going to Paris"  – 4:39  
 "The Three Day Man"  – 3:35  
 "Bury My Heart"  – 6:22  
 "Out of Control"   – 4:07  
 "Love That Kills"  – 6:02

References

1994 compilation albums
The Waterboys albums
Chrysalis Records compilation albums